The Airmen of Note is the premier jazz ensemble of the United States Air Force and part of the United States Air Force Band. Created in 1950 to carry on the tradition of Major Glenn Miller's Army Air Corps dance band, the "Note" is a touring big band that consists of 18 professional jazz musicians from across the United States.

The band has presented jazz performances to audiences throughout the United States, Europe, and Asia and produces broadcasts and recordings, with one release reaching number two on the JazzWeek jazz album chart. In 1954 the Airmen of Note played Miller's band in the movie The Glenn Miller Story.

Musical style
The Glenn Miller sound has remained central, but the band adopted a more contemporary sound in the 1950s and 1960s largely due to staff arrangers such as Sammy Nestico. Over the past four decades, Mike Crotty and Alan Baylock have taken that role. To augment its writing staff, the Airmen of Note has commissioned works by Bob Florence, Bob Mintzer, Rob McConnell, and Bill Holman. Sammy Nestico and former band member Tommy Newsom have composed works for the group. The group took a further step in diversifying their sound in their 2019 album Global Reach, which featured tunes inspired by cultures from across the world.

Music education
Many of its members have backgrounds in music education. They lead clinics at high schools and colleges across the country and have been invited to perform at conventions such as the International Association of Jazz Educators, Music Educators National Conference, and The Midwest Clinic.

Guests
The Airmen of Note have recorded and performed with Allen Vizzutti, Dizzy Gillespie, Joe Williams, Sarah Vaughan and Nancy Wilson. In 1990, the Airmen of Note established the Jazz Heritage Series, featuring the "Note" in concert with icons of jazz. Musicians that have joined the "Note" for the program include Al Jarreau, Clark Terry, Phil Woods, Kurt Elling, Kurt Rosenwinkel, Paquito D'Rivera, Nicholas Payton, Gordon Goodwin, and Karrin Allyson. Every year, the Jazz Heritage Series is broadcast over National Public Radio, independent jazz radio stations, satellite radio, and the internet.

Discography
 Surprising Sounds of the Airmen of Note (1966)
 Big Band Sound '67 (1967)
 In Concert Sound (1967)
 Airmen of Note & Friends (1968)
 Here Come the Airmen of Note (1968)
 Rock Jazz (1970)
 With a Little Help From Our Friends (1972)
 Two Sides of the Airmen of Note (1973)
 Come Out Swingin (1973)
 Airmen of Note and Sarah Vaughan (1974)
 Brothers in Blue (1974)
 New Spirit (1977)
 Today! (1978)
 Just in Time (1978)
 Live from Mobile (1979)
 Just the Way We Are (1980)
 Noel (1981)
 Better Than Ever (1983)
 Bone Voyage (1984)
 Crystal Gardens (1985)
 Somewhere Out There (1986)
 Jazz Heritage: Old, New, Borrowed & Blue (1989)
 Santa Claus Is Comin' to Town (1991)
 Children of the Night (1993)
 The Glenn Miller Tradition (1994/1982)
 Blues & Beyond (1996)
 Legacy (1997)
 Christmas Time Is Here (1998)
 Invitation (1999)
 Let's Dance (2000)
 Fifty Years of the Airmen of Note (2000)
 ¡Tiempo Latino! (A Celebration of Latin Jazz) (2004)
 A Holiday Note from Home (2006)
 Keep 'em Flying (2006)
 Out in Front (2006)
 Airmen of Note Live! (2007)
 Cool Yule (2009)
 Airmen of Note "60" (2010)
 Compositions (2012)
 Airmen of Note (2016)
 Veterans of Jazz (2017)
 Best of the Jazz Heritage Series, Vol. 1 (2018)
 Global Reach (2019)

See also
 United States military bands
 Alan Baylock
 Tim Eyermann
 Walt Levinsky
 Joe Locke
 Vaughn Nark
 Sammy Nestico
 Bob Snyder
 Allen Vizzutti

References

External links
 Official site

American jazz ensembles
Big bands
Bands of the United States Air Force
Musical groups established in 1950